Abraham Falk Muus (1789 – ??) was a Norwegian jurist and politician.

He was elected to the Parliament of Norway from the constituency Hedemarkens Amt. He was a district stipendiary magistrate there. He served one term, in 1830.

He was a great-grandfather of Rudolf Falck Ræder.

References

1789 births
Year of death missing
Norwegian jurists
Members of the Storting
Hedmark politicians